Aheri may refer to:
 Aheri, Gadchiroli, Maharashtra, India
 Aheri, Karnataka, India
 Aheri, Papua New Guinea
 Aheri, a community with origins in India, also known as Aheria